11,491 athletes were registered to compete at the 2016 Summer Olympics held in Rio de Janeiro, Brazil.

All Olympic sports are signed up to the World Anti-Doping Agency (WADA) code which operates on a strict liability principle, whereby an athlete is strictly liable for any adverse analytical finding from their urine or blood samples. Until 2015, the standard punishment for a first doping offence was two years suspension. For a second or subsequent offence, the standard punishment is between 8 years suspension and a lifetime ban. From 2015 onwards, the standard suspension for an adverse finding involving an unspecified substance such as steroids and human growth hormone was increased to four years.

In July 2016 the International Olympic Committee (IOC) decided, following the publication of the McLaren Report, that the eligibility of all Russian athletes to compete in the 2016 Olympics must be determined individually by each sport's governing body. This decision was based on the findings about the Russian state-sponsored doping program. Two athletes, swimmer Yuliya Yefimova and cyclist Olga Zabelinskaya, whose participation would not have been allowed under this ruling, was exceptionally allowed to compete by the IOC after their ban was deemed "unenforceable" by the Court of Arbitration for Sport. At least 96 other athletes, representing 52 countries in 13 sports, who were registered to compete have previously been convicted of a doping offence.

Athletes

See also 
 Doping at the Olympic Games

References 
General

 

Specific

2016 Summer Olympics
2016
Doping
Olympic Games controversies
2016 controversies